Carl Richardt Schmidt (20 May 1904 – 3 January 1992) was a Danish rower. He competed at the 1928 Summer Olympics in Amsterdam with the men's eight where they were eliminated in round two.

References

1904 births
1992 deaths
Danish male rowers
Olympic rowers of Denmark
Rowers at the 1928 Summer Olympics
Rowers from Copenhagen
European Rowing Championships medalists